Huamei may refer to:

 Li hing mui ( huàméi), pickled ume
 Chinese hwamei ( huàméi), a songbird of China
 A character in Kai Lung Unrolls His Mat
 Hua Mei (giant panda) (华美 huáměi), a giant panda in the San Diego Zoo